Rishabh is the second svara out of the seven svaras of Hindustani music and Carnatic music. Rishabh is the long form of the syllable रे for simplicity while singing the syllable. Rishabh is pronounced as Re and Ri (notation - R). It is also called as ऋषभ in the Devanagri script.

Detail 
The following is the information about Rishabh and its importance in Indian classical music :

 Rishabh is the second svara in an octave or Saptak.
 Re is the immediate next svara of Shadja (Sa).
 The svara of Rishabh is  Komal and Shuddha.
 It is said that Shadja is the basic svara from which all the other 6 svaras are produced. When we break the word Shadja then we get, Shad and Ja. It means that Shad is 6 and ja is 'giving birth' in Marathi. So basically the translation is :
  षड् - 6, ज -जन्म . Therefore, it collectively means giving birth to the other 6 notes of the music.
So the svara Re is formed from Shadja.
 The frequency of Rishabh is 270 Hz. The frequencies of the seven svaras are also given below: Sa 240 Hz, Re 270 Hz, Ga 300 Hz, Ma 320 Hz, Pa 360 Hz, Dha 400 Hz, and Ni 450 Hz, Sa 480 Hz (Taar Saptak) ........ (and so on). 'Sa' can have any frequency but then the frequencies of other svaras increase or decrease with a common ratio or difference.
Consequently, the Re after the Sa of 480 Hz (Taar Saptak) has a frequency of 540 Hz i.e. the double of the Lower octave Re.
 There are 3 Shruti's of Rishabh. Previously the main Shruti, not only for Re but for all the other svaras, was on the last Shruti but now it is considered to be on the 1st Shrurti.
For example, if these are the 3 Shruti's of Re then,

                     Previously this was the position of the main Shruti of Re.
                     ^ 
              1   2  3
              ^
              But now this position has become the main Shruti of Re.
 All the other svaras except Shadja (Sa) and Pancham (Pa) can be  or s but Sa and Pa are always Shuddha svaras. And hence svaras Sa and Pa are called Achal Svaras , since these svaras don't move from their original position. Svaras Ra, Ga, Ma, Dha, Ni are called Chal Svaras, since these svaras move from their original position.
    
     Sa, Re, Ga, Ma, Pa, Dha, Ni - Shuddha Svaras
    
     Re, Ga, Dha, Ni -  
   
     Ma - 

 Ragas from Bhairav Thaat, Poorvi Thaat, Marwa Thaat, Bhairavi Thaat and Todi Thaat have Komal Rishabh, rest of the thaats have Shuddha Rishabh.
 Ragas where Re is the Vadi svara - Raga Brindabani Sarang, etc. Ragas where Re is the Samvadi svara - Raga Bhairav, etc.
 Hypothetically speaking, Re is said to be the Rishimuni (also known as Rushimuni), Rishimuni as in, the three main gods, Bhrama, Vishnu and Shiva were first created i.e. Sakar Bhrama (Sa) and then these three gods created the Rishimunis (the sages) i.e. Re. Re is made the acronym of Rishimuni for showing the importance of the syllable Re.
 Rishabh is said to be sourced from the lowing of a bull.
 Rishabh is associated with the planet Mars. 
 Rishabh is the Name of the earliest and the very First Tirthankara of Jainism
 Rishabh is associated with Red colour.

Difference in pronouncing
In the introductory part of Risaba it is given that, 'Risabh is the long form of the syllables रे and री. For simplicity in pronouncing while singing the syllable, Risabh is pronounced as Re and Ri'. This is given because the pronouncing of the syllable Re is different in the Hindustani classical music and Carnatic classical music. In Hindustani classical music, the pronouncing of Risabha is done as Re and in Carnatic classical music, the pronouncing of Risabh is done as Ri.

So a Hindustani classical singer will sing the 7 svaras as : Sa Re Ga Ma Pa Dha Ni Sa.

While a Carnatic classical singer will sing these svaras like : Sa Ri Ga Ma Pa Dha Ni Sa.

See also
 List of Ragas in Hindustani classical music
 Svara
 Shadja (Sa)
 Gandhar (Ga)
 Madhyam (Ma)
 Pancham (Pa)
 Dhaivat (Dha)
 Nishad (Ni)

 Re (svara)

References

Indian classical music
Musical notation
Musical scales
Hindustani music terminology
Carnatic music terminology